Diego Ramírez (born 1989) is a Mexican/Australian artist and writer working across different mediums. Born in Guadalajara, Mexico he relocated to Melbourne, Australia in 2008.

Career

He graduated with a Bachelor of Fine Arts (Media Arts) from RMIT University  and an Honours degree of Fine Arts from Monash University. 

In 2018, he screened a selection of his video works in a partnership between ACCA and Australian Centre for the Moving Image, as part of their ART+FILM program curated by Anabelle Lacroix.  He has shown in Australia at Gertrude Glasshouse, Westspace, Blakdot and internationally at Deslave (Mexico), Human Resources (US), Torrance Art Museum (US), Art Central (HK), and Careof (IT). Ramírez has written locally for Art Gallery of Western Australia, Art and Australia, Disclaimer, MEMO, un Projects and internationally with NECSUS (NL) and BLUE journal (US x FR). 

He writes cultural commentary in the area of creative non-fiction, often using a performative voice inspired by the comedic traits of the anti-hero.

Ramirez is represented in Melbourne by [MARS] Gallery.

References

External links
Diego Ramirez Artist Page - MARS Gallery Melbourne
diegoismonster
Moutain/Happiness
https://web.archive.org/web/20150217103310/http://south3.net/s3/writers_files/David%20Corbet_SOUTH_LOWRES.pdf
6th Cairo Video Festival Catalouge by Medrar - Issuu
http://file.org.br/wp-content/uploads/2014/09/PDF-FILE-SAO-PAULO-2014.pdf

https://web.archive.org/web/20150320083933/http://redlands.nsw.edu.au/download.cfm?downloadfile=670922CF-FFA3-CA98-0E67CBA588CAAF63&typename=dmFile&fieldname=filename
Space: Around the galleries
Diego Ramirez Biography, Artworks & Exhibitions | Ocula Artist

1989 births
Living people
Artists from Melbourne
Artists from Jalisco
Australian people of Mexican descent
Mexican emigrants to Australia
People from Guadalajara, Jalisco